The Bullion Tunnel, located east of Avery, Idaho was listed on the National Register of Historic Places in 1984.

It protected about 50 fire fighters from death in the 1910 North Idaho fire.

References

Buildings and structures on the National Register of Historic Places in Idaho
Shoshone County, Idaho
Tunnels on the National Register of Historic Places